Micromyrtus mucronulata is a plant species of the family Myrtaceae endemic to Western Australia.

It is found in a small are near Yalgoo in the Mid West region of Western Australia where it grows in sandy soils.

References

mucronulata
Flora of Western Australia
Plants described in 2010
Taxa named by Barbara Lynette Rye